He Chao (born 19 April 1995) is a Chinese footballer who currently plays as a midfielder for Chinese Super League side Wuhan Three Towns.

Club career
He Chao started his football career when he joined Changchun Yatai's youth academy in 2006. In December 2011, He went to Portugal for the Chinese Football Association's 500.com Stars Project and joined Casa Pia's youth academy. He was then promoted to Changchun's first team squad in 2014. He made his debut for the club on 12 April 2014 in a 1–0 away loss against Shanghai East Asia.

On 7 February 2019, He transferred to Chinese Super League side Guangzhou Evergrande after Changchun was relegated to the second tier. He made his debut for the club on 1 March 2019 in a 3–0 home win against Tianjin Tianhai. On 9 July 2019, He was loaned out to fellow top tier side Jiangsu Suning for the remainder of the 2019 season.

On 29 April 2022, he signed with newly promoted top tier side Wuhan Three Towns. He would go on to make his debut on 3 June 2022, in a league game against Hebei, which ended in a 4-0 victory. After the game he would go on to establish himself as a regular within the team that won the 2022 Chinese Super League title.

International career
He made his debut for the Chinese national team on 9 December 2017 in a 2–2 draw against South Korea in the 2017 EAFF E-1 Football Championship.

Career statistics

Club statistics
.

International statistics

Honours

Club
Guangzhou Evergrande
Chinese Super League: 2019.

Wuhan Three Towns
Chinese Super League: 2022.

References

External links
 
 

1995 births
Living people
Chinese footballers
Footballers from Liaoning
People from Liaoyang
Changchun Yatai F.C. players
Guangzhou F.C. players
Jiangsu F.C. players
Chinese Super League players
Association football midfielders
China international footballers
Footballers at the 2018 Asian Games
Asian Games competitors for China
21st-century Chinese people